Carlos Prudencio Martínez Gómez (May 15, 1895 – death date unknown) was a Cuban pitcher in the Negro leagues between 1918 and 1922.

A native of Regla, Cuba, Martínez made his Negro leagues debut in 1918 with the Cuban Stars (West). He played for the club again in 1920, then went on to play for the All Cubans and the Cuban Stars (East) in 1921 and 1922.

References

External links
 and Baseball-Reference Black Baseball stats and Seamheads

1895 births
Year of death missing
Place of death missing
All Cubans players
Cuban Stars (East) players
Cuban Stars (West) players
Baseball pitchers
Baseball players from Havana